Museum of the Islands (MOTI) is a museum in Pine Island Center, Lee County, Florida. Exhibits include shells, dolls, household items, and fishing artifacts. The museum is housed in a former library building. It opened in 1989. The museum is located at 5728 Sesame.

See also
List of museums in Florida

External links
Museum of the Islands website

Museum of the Islands
Museums established in 1989
Natural history museums in Florida
Museums in Lee County, Florida
History museums in Florida
Shell museums